The 1980 United States heat wave was a period of intense heat and drought that wreaked havoc on much of the Midwestern United States and Southern Plains throughout the summer of 1980. It was among the most destructive and most lethal natural disasters in U.S. history, claiming at least 1,700 lives. Because of the massive drought, agricultural damage reached US$20 billion (equivalent to $ billion in  dollars). It is among the billion-dollar weather disasters listed by the National Oceanic and Atmospheric Administration.

Causes

The heat wave began in June when a strong high pressure ridge began to build in the central and southern United States allowing temperatures to soar to  almost every day from June to September. The high pressure system also acted as a cap on the atmosphere inhibiting the development of thunderstorm activity, leading to exceptionally severe drought conditions. The heat wave paused briefly when the decaying Hurricane Allen disrupted the prevailing weather pattern.

Effects

The drought and heat wave conditions led many Midwestern cities to experience record heat. In Indianapolis, Indiana on July 15, the temperature reached  for the first time since 1954.

In Dallas/Fort Worth, Texas, high temperatures exceeded  a total of 69 times, including a record 42 consecutive days from June 23 to August 3, of which 28 days were above 105, and five days above 110.  The area saw 29 days in which the previous record high temperature was either broken or tied, including its all-time high when the temperature hit  on three consecutive days (June 26 and 27 at DFW Airport and June 28 at Dallas Love Field).

Some 43% of American homes were without air conditioning in 1980.

Hurricane Allen briefly paused the heat wave in early August. The 2011 North American heat wave would ultimately surpass the 1980 heat wave in terms of number of days with highs exceeding 100 (with 71 days) and the highest-ever low temperature for a single day (86 degrees); however, that heat wave only had 40 consecutive days of temperatures exceeding 100 (two short of the record) and the 113 degrees of 1980 remains a DFW all-time high. The high temperatures of the 1980 heat wave were worse than 2011, as was its early start in June and its ultimate human toll.

On the northern rim of the high pressure ridge, several severe long-lived windstorms called derechos formed. The most notable was the "More Trees Down Derecho" that occurred on July 5. It raced from eastern Nebraska to Virginia in 15 hours, killing six and injuring about 70. The Western Wisconsin Derecho of July 15 killed three, and caused extensive property damage.

See also

 1988–89 North American drought
 Extreme weather
 List of disasters
 List of United States disasters by death toll
 Meteorology

References

Further reading

Heat wave
United States heat wave
Natural disasters in Texas
Natural disasters in Missouri
Natural disasters in Tennessee
1980
1980 heat waves